Kalju (meaning "cliff") is an Estonian-language male given name.

People named Kalju include:
Kalju Jurkatamm (born 1941), Estonian sprinter and hurdler
Kalju Kangur (1925–1989), Estonian writer and translator
Kalju Karask (1931–2011), Estonian opera and operetta singer and actor
Kalju Koha (born 1956), Estonian politician
Kalju Komissarov (born 1946), Estonian actor
Kalju Kruusa (born 1973), Estonian poet, editor and translator
Kalju Lepik, (1920–1999), Estonian poet
 (born 1932), Estonian freedom fighter, Soviet dissident
Kalju Ojaste (born 1961), Estonian biathlete 
Kalju Orro (born 1952), Estonian actor
Kalju Pitksaar (1931–1995), Estonian chess player
Kalju Põldvere (born 1929), Estonian zoologist, medical doctor, educator and politician
 (1921–2004), Estonian sculptor
Kalju Suur (born 1928), Estonian photographer
Kalju Teras (1922–1990), Estonian educator
Kalju Tonuma, (born 1970), Australian audio artist

References

Estonian masculine given names